Mana Mecchida Sose is a 1992 Indian Kannada-language romantic drama film directed by B. Ramamurthy and written by Ilavarasan. The film stars Malashri, Sunil and Abhijith. The film's music was composed by Upendra Kumar and the audio was launched on the Lahari Music banner.

This was actor P. Ravi Shankar's second movie in Kannada after his debut movie  Halli Krishna Delhi Radha which had the same actors as this movie. The movie was a remake of 1989 Malayalam movie Chakkikotha Chankaran which itself was heavily inspired by the 1987 Tamil film Enga Veettu Ramayanam.

Cast 

Malashri 
Sunil
Abhijith
K. S. Ashwath
Dheerendra Gopal
Girija Lokesh
P. Ravi Shankar
Mynavathi
Shani Mahadevappa
Ashwath Narayan
Sarigama Viji

Soundtrack 
The music of the film was composed by Upendra Kumar with lyrics by Chi. Udaya Shankar.

References 

1992 films
1990s Kannada-language films
Indian drama films
Films scored by Upendra Kumar
Kannada remakes of Malayalam films
Films directed by B. Ramamurthy
1992 drama films